DXNS-TV (Channel 7) is an analog television station owned by the Northern Mindanao Broadcasting System in Butuan. It was formerly affiliated with GMA Network and People's Television Network. Its studios and transmitters are located at 4th Floor L.T. & Sons Bldg., Montilla Boulevard, Butuan.

About DXNS-TV
In 2014, the NMBS affiliation did not renew GMA for almost 2 years then aired programs from PTV and later it became Bee TV. On September 4, 2015, GMA started to broadcast on UHF Channel 26 owned by the GMA Network itself. The new 5-kilowatt analog UHF relay TV station Butuan brings to 52 the total number of GMA transmitting stations nationwide.

References

Television stations in Butuan
Television channels and stations established in 1995